The 1986 United States Senate election in Vermont was held on November 4, 1986. Incumbent Democratic U.S. Senator Patrick Leahy won reelection to a third term, defeating Republican former governor Richard Snelling by a landslide margin of almost 30 points, in a race that was initially expected to be quite competitive, as Snelling was recruited to run by popular President Ronald Reagan.

Democratic primary

Candidates
 Patrick Leahy, incumbent U.S. Senator

Results

Liberty Union primary

Candidates
 Jerry Levy, sociologist and perennial candidate

Results

Republican primary
The popular former Governor of Vermont, Richard A. Snelling, had faced pressure from national Republicans to enter the race, but had spent the majority of 1985 convinced that he would not be a candidate. In October 1985, however, encouraged by figures such as New Mexico Senator Pete Domenici and President of the United States Ronald Reagan, Snelling changed his mind and entered the race, claiming that a lack of action over the United States national deficit had encouraged him to run.

Candidates
 Richard A. Snelling, former Governor of Vermont
 Anthony N. Doria, founder of the Vermont Law School and perennial candidate

Results

General election

Campaign
Both Leahy and Snelling were well-respected and highly popular in Vermont, and the general feeling was that they would both make good Senators. However, Snelling was felt to be at a disadvantage for several reasons, including the fact that his main campaign plank was deficit reduction, which The Caledonian-Record noted Leahy was already a well-known advocate for, and the fact that Leahy had acquired a reputation as one of the Senate's most knowledgable figures on the issue of nuclear proliferation, an issue which the Brattleboro Reformer noted Snelling had no experience with.

Snelling frequently attacked Leahy by calling him a "liberal" during the campaign, part of a broader strategy of negative campaigning against the incumbent.

Candidates
 Anthony Doria (C), perennial candidate
 Patrick Leahy (D), incumbent U.S. Senator
 Jerry Levy (LU), sociologist and perennial candidate
 Richard A. Snelling (R), former Governor of Vermont

Endorsements

Results

See also 
 1986 United States Senate elections

References 

Vermont
1986
1986 Vermont elections